Evince, also known as GNOME Document Viewer, is a free and open source document viewer supporting many document file formats including PDF, PostScript, DjVu, TIFF, XPS and DVI. It is designed for the GNOME desktop environment.

The developers of Evince intended to replace the multiple GNOME document viewers with a single and simple application. The Evince motto sums up the project aim: "Simply a Document Viewer".

GNOME releases have included Evince since GNOME 2.12 (September 2005). Evince's code is written mainly in C, with a small part (specifically, the interface with Poppler) written in C++. Many Linux distributions – including Ubuntu, Fedora Linux and Linux Mint – include Evince as the default document viewer.

Evince is free and open-source software subject to the requirements of the GNU General Public License version 2 or later.

The Evince FAQ highlights the meaning of the word "Evince" as "to show or express something clearly".

History
Evince began as a rewrite of GPdf, which its support programmers had started to find unwieldy to maintain. Evince quickly surpassed the functionality of GPdf and replaced both GPdf and GGV in the September 2005 release of GNOME 2.12.

There was at one time a Windows version of Evince and it was then included on the VALO-CD, a collection of "Best of Free and Open Source Software for Windows".

Features
Evince incorporates an integrated search that displays the number of results found and highlights the results on the page. Users can optionally display (in the left sidebar of the viewer) thumbnails of pages to assist in page navigation within a document. When documents support indices, Evince gives the option of showing the document index for quickly moving from one section to another.

Evince can show two pages at a time, left and right, and offers full-screen and slide-show views.

Evince allows the selection of text in PDF files and allows users to highlight and copy text from documents made from scanned images, if the PDF includes OCR data.

Evince used to obey the DRM restrictions of PDF files, which may prevent copying, printing, or converting some PDF files, however this has been made optional, and turned off by default in gconf.

Since version 3.18.2 evince allows for text and highlight annotations of documents.

Supported document formats
Evince supports many different single and multi-page document formats:

Built-in support
 PDF using the Poppler backend
 PostScript using the Ghostscript backend.
 Multi-page TIFF
 DVI
 DjVu using the DjVuLibre backend
 OpenDocument Presentation (.odp) when built with the --enable-impress option
 Images (currently included as a toy, but needs work)
 CBR, CBZ, CB7 (Comic Book Archive file)
 Adobe Illustrator Artwork

Optional support
 XPS

Possible or planned support
 Microsoft PowerPoint using libpreview (currently alpha-quality)
 Microsoft Word
 OpenDocument
 AbiWord

Not supported
 EPUB
 Mobi

See also

 List of PDF software

References

External links

 

Free PDF readers
Free software programmed in C
GNOME Core Applications
PostScript
Office software that uses GTK